The University of Panama was founded on October 7, 1935. Initially, it had 175 students learning education, commerce, natural sciences, pharmacy, pre-engineering or law. , it had 74,059 students distributed in 228 buildings across the country.

The University of Panama was founded  under the administration of the President of the Republic, Dr. Harmodio Arias Madrid. Its founder and first President was the distinguished citizen Dr. Octavio Méndez Pereira.

History

The University of Panama was created by presidential decree on May 29, 1935. However, it began operations on October 7 of the same year in one of the wings of the Instituto Nacional (National Institute). Later on, under the administration of Enrique A. Jiménez, the government purchased around 60 hectares of land in the neighborhood of El Cangrejo, destined to be the future University's main campus.

Construction work began in January 1948, under the supervision of Engineer Alberto De Saint Malo, who was the Dean of the Engineering and Architecture Faculty at the time. The first four buildings to be constructed were those that would be home to the Humanities, Engineering and Architecture faculties and Science laboratories, and the Administration and Library. Classes in the new buildings began on May 29, 1950. However, the campus was officially inaugurated on November 1, 1953, the same year of the Republic of Panama's 50th Anniversary of Independence. In the 1950s, construction work continued and 11 additional buildings were raised, some of which would hold the Biochemistry Center, and the Faculties of Pharmacy, and Public Administration and Commerce. In the following decade, 15 more buildings were constructed, among of which figure the Odontology and Law Faculties, and the Experimental Center for Agricultural Research in Tocumen.

Between 1970 and 1980, the buildings that were destined for Biology, Architecture, Engineering, Humanities (other), and those destined for the Simón Bolivar Library and for the Laboratory of Specialized Analysis, among others, were finished. At the end of 1979, the University of Panama received the facilities of the Rainbow City High School in Colón, where the first of the University's Regional Centers would begin operations. In the following decade, the Regional Centers for the provinces of Veraguas, Chiriquí and Coclé, and for the region of Azuero were built, including an Agricultural Sciences Faculty in Chiriquí.

In the 1990s, the Regional Center for Panamá Oeste (Western Panama) and four buildings destined for research were constructed. At the end of the decade, in 1999 to be more specific, the ARI (Interoceanic Regional Authority), the Panamanian government agency once responsible for the management of the land of the former Panama Canal Zone, transferred the buildings of the former Curundu Junior High School to the University of Panama. This complex would later become the Harmodio Arias Madrid Campus. Other facilities transferred were the ones later used for the Veterinary Hospital, in Corozal. Also during this time, the University expanded its number of buildings by adding 19 more, thanks to the acquisition of adjacent buildings and to the construction of the Regional Center in Bocas del Toro, the extensions of Chepo and Darién, and the Popular Universities of Azuero and Coclé, today known as Universidades del Trabajo y La Tercera Edad (Universities of Labor and Elders).

Achievements
Several international research agreements and personnel exchanges have been made by government agencies with the institution. Professors in areas of science and technology, medical health, economics and law have been invited to give keynotes and also teach in other campuses around the world.  The University of Panama has also sent representatives to several international congresses and meetings such as Women and Gender, World Economic Forum, environmental congresses, biological research meetings, statistics congresses and many other disciplines.

It is currently positioned at #1 in the best universities in Panama.

Faculties 

 Public Administration
 Business Administration
 Architecture
 Fine Arts
 Agricultural Sciences
 Education
 Natural Sciences and Technology
 Communications
 Law and Political Sciences
 Economics
 Nursing
 Pharmacy
 Humanities
 Computer Science, Electronics and Communication
 Medicine
 Veterinary Medicine
 Odontology
 Psychology
 Graphic Design

Notable faculty 

 Noris Salazar Allen (born 1947), bryologist

External links 
 

 
Buildings and structures in Panama City
Education in Panama City
Educational institutions established in 1935
Forestry education
Members of the International Council for Science
Universities in Panama
Members of the International Science Council
1935 establishments in Panama